In mathematics, Stirling's approximation (or Stirling's formula) is an approximation for factorials. It is named after James Stirling, though a related but less precise result was first stated by Abraham de Moivre.

One way of stating the approximation involves the logarithm of the factorial:

In computer science applications such as the worst-case lower bound for comparison sorting, it is convenient to use instead the binary logarithm, giving the equivalent form

Here the sign  means that the two quantities are asymptotic, that is, that their ratio tends to 1 as  tends to infinity. The following version of the bound holds for all , rather than only asymptotically:

Derivation 
Roughly speaking, the simplest version of Stirling's formula can be quickly obtained by approximating the sum

with an integral:

The full formula, together with precise estimates of its error, can be derived as follows. Instead of approximating , one considers its natural logarithm, as this is a slowly varying function:

The right-hand side of this equation minus

is the approximation by the trapezoid rule of the integral

and the error in this approximation is given by the Euler–Maclaurin formula:

Take limits to find that

Because the remainder  in the Euler–Maclaurin formula satisfies

where big-O notation is used, combining the equations above yields the approximation formula in its logarithmic form:

Taking the exponential of both sides and choosing any positive integer , one obtains a formula involving an unknown quantity . For , the formula is

The quantity  can be found by taking the limit on both sides as  tends to infinity and using Wallis' product, which shows that . Therefore, one obtains Stirling's formula:

Alternative derivation 
An alternative formula for  using the gamma function is

(as can be seen by repeated integration by parts). Rewriting and changing variables , one obtains

Applying Laplace's method one has

which recovers Stirling's formula:

In fact, further corrections can also be obtained using Laplace's method. For example, computing the second-order expansion using Laplace's method yields (using little-o notation)

and gives Stirling's formula to two orders:

A complex-analysis version of this method is to consider  as a Taylor coefficient of the exponential function , computed by Cauchy's integral formula as

This line integral can then be approximated using the saddle-point method with an appropriate choice of contour radius . The dominant portion of the integral near the saddle point is then approximated by a real integral and Laplace's method, while the remaining portion of the integral can be bounded above to give an error term.

Speed of convergence and error estimates 

Stirling's formula is in fact the first approximation to the following series (now called the Stirling series):

An explicit formula for the coefficients in this series was given by G. Nemes.

As , the error in the truncated series is asymptotically equal to the first omitted term. This is an example of an asymptotic expansion. It is not a convergent series; for any particular value of  there are only so many terms of the series that improve accuracy, after which accuracy worsens.  This is shown in the next graph, which shows the relative error versus the number of terms in the series, for larger numbers of terms. More precisely, let  be the Stirling series to  terms evaluated at .  The graphs show 

which, when small, is essentially the relative error.

Writing Stirling's series in the form

it is known that the error in truncating the series is always of the opposite sign and at most the same magnitude as the first omitted term.

More precise bounds, due to Robbins, valid for all positive integers  are

A looser version of this bound is that  for all .

Stirling's formula for the gamma function
For all positive integers,

where  denotes the gamma function.

However, the gamma function, unlike the factorial, is more broadly defined for all complex numbers other than non-positive integers; nevertheless, Stirling's formula may still be applied. If , then

Repeated integration by parts gives

The corresponding approximation may now be written:

A further application of this asymptotic expansion is for complex argument  with constant .

Error bounds 
For any positive integer , the following notation is introduced:

and

Then

For further information and other error bounds, see the cited papers.

A convergent version of Stirling's formula
Thomas Bayes showed, in a letter to John Canton published by the Royal Society in 1763, that Stirling's formula did not give a convergent series.  Obtaining a convergent version of Stirling's formula entails evaluating Binet's formula:

One way to do this is by means of a convergent series of inverted rising exponentials. If

then

where

where  denotes the Stirling numbers of the first kind. From this one obtains a version of Stirling's series

which converges when .

Versions suitable for calculators
The approximation

and its equivalent form

can be obtained by rearranging Stirling's extended formula and observing a coincidence between the resultant power series and the Taylor series expansion of the hyperbolic sine function. Robert H. Windschitl suggested it in 2002 for computing the gamma function with fair accuracy on calculators with limited program or register memory.

Gergő Nemes proposed in 2007 an approximation which gives the same number of exact digits as the Windschitl approximation but is much simpler:

or equivalently,

An alternative approximation for the gamma function stated by Srinivasa Ramanujan (Ramanujan 1988) is

The approximation may be made precise by giving paired upper and lower bounds; one such inequality is

History 
The formula was first discovered by Abraham de Moivre in the form

De Moivre gave an approximate rational-number expression for the natural logarithm of the constant. Stirling's contribution consisted of showing that the constant is precisely .

See also
 Lanczos approximation
 Spouge's approximation

References

Further reading
 [DEAD LINK]

External links

 
 Peter Luschny, Approximation formulas for the factorial function n!
 
 

Approximations
Asymptotic analysis
Analytic number theory
Gamma and related functions
Theorems in analysis